Golyam Izvor refers to the following places in Bulgaria:

 Golyam Izvor, Haskovo Province
 Golyam Izvor, Lovech Province